The term "exotheology" was coined in the 1960s or early 1970s for the examination of theological issues as they pertain to extraterrestrial intelligence. It is primarily concerned with either conjecture about possible theological beliefs that extraterrestrials might have, or how our own theologies would be influenced by evidence of and/or interaction with extraterrestrials.

One of the main themes of exotheology is applying the concept of extraterrestrials who are sentient, and more to the point, endowed with a soul,  as a thought experiment to the examination of a given theology, mostly Christian theology, occasionally also Jewish theology.

Christianity
A Christian writer early to address the question was C. S. Lewis (1898–1963) who in a 1950s article  in the  Christian Herald contemplated the possibility of the Son of God incarnating in other, extraterrestrial, worlds, or else that God could devise an entirely distinct plan of salvation for extraterrestrial communities from the one applicable to humans.
  
Lutheran theologian Ted Peters (2003) asserts that the questions raised by the possibility of extraterrestrial life are by no means new to Christian theology and by no means pose, as asserted by other authors, a threat for Christian dogma. Peters points out that medieval theology had frequently considered the question of "what if God had created many worlds?", as had the far earlier Church Fathers in discussion of the Antipodes.

The Catholic Vatican theologian Corrado Balducci often discussed the question in Italian popular media, and in 2001 published a statement UFOs and Extraterrestrials - A Problem for the Church?.
In a 2008 statement, José Gabriel Funes, head of the Vatican Observatory, said
"Just as there is a multiplicity of creatures on earth, there can be other beings, even intelligent, created by God. This is not in contrast with our faith because we can't put limits on God's creative freedom".

Smaller denominations also have similar treatments in passing in their key writings: Christian Science and the Course in Miracles treat extraterrestrials as effectively brother spiritual beings in a non-absolute physical experience, the founder of the former writing, "The universe of Spirit is peopled with spiritual beings,...", and Emanuel Swedenborg wrote, "Anyone with a sound intellect can know from many considerations that there are numerous worlds with people on them. Rational thought leads to the conclusion that massive bodies such as the planets, some of which are larger than our own earth, are not empty masses created merely to wander aimlessly around the sun, and shine with their feeble light on one planet. No, they must have a much greater purpose than that. ... What would one planet be to God, who is infinite, and for whom thousands, or even tens of thousands of planets, all full of inhabitants, would be such a trifling matter as to be almost nothing?"

Judaism
Rabbi Aryeh Kaplan, who was also a physicist, was inclined toward the belief in extraterrestrial life, citing various classic Jewish authorities. Among them are the medieval philosopher Rabbi Chasdai Crescas (Ohr Hashem 4:2) and 18th century kabbalist Rabbi Pinchas Eliyahu Horowitz (Sefer HaBris). After presenting his sources, Rabbi Kaplan remarks, "We therefore find the basic thesis of the Sefer HaBris supported by a number of clear-cut statements by our Sages. There may even be other forms of intelligent life in the universe, but such life forms do not have free will, and therefore do not have moral responsibility"—at least in the same sense as human beings.
Rabbi Kaplan also cites Judges 5:23 ("Cursed is Meroz..."), about which Rashi, the foremost medieval commentator remarks, "Some say [Meroz] was a planet, and some say [Meroz] was a prominent person who was near the battle area and yet did not come [to intervene]." 

Rabbi Norman Lamm, former chancellor of Yeshiva University, has also written on this subject, asserting that if the existence of extraterrestrial life should be confirmed, religious scholars must revise previous assumptions to the contrary. He, too, does not rule out this possibility from an Orthodox Jewish point of view.

Rabbi Joseph B. Soloveitchik is cited as having been open-minded about extraterrestrial life. He is said to have remarked that life on other planets would only reflect God's greatness, which exceeds mortal understanding, while not contradicting the role of the Jewish people to heed the Torah and in so doing to perform God's will here on earth.

Islam
Depending on the suras cited, the Quran of Islam appears to leave open the door to the idea of extraterrestrials, as in 27:65, situated similarly on a par with humans subject to a divine judgment leading toward a heaven or hell as reward or punishment for the deeds of one's life.

See also 

 Cosmic pluralism
 Exopolitics 
 Potential cultural impact of extraterrestrial contact 
 Ufology

References

General references 
 Thomas F. O'Meara, O.P. "Christian Theology and Extraterrestrial Intelligent Life." Theological Studies 60 (1999): 3-30.
 

Extraterrestrial life
Theology
Thought experiments
20th-century neologisms